Kenneth Burgoyne Tomkins (14 September 1917 – 20 July 1990) was a politician in Queensland, Australia. He was a Member of the Queensland Legislative Assembly.

Politics
Ken Tomkins was a member of the Bungil Shire Council from 1949 to 1967 and its chairman from 1967 to 1975.

On 14 March 1967, the Country Party member for Roma in the Queensland Legislative Assembly, William Ewan, died. Standing as the Country Party candidate, Ken Tomkins won the resulting by-election on 24 June 1967. He held that seat until 22 October 1983, when he did not contest the 1983 election.

References

Members of the Queensland Legislative Assembly
1917 births
1990 deaths
National Party of Australia members of the Parliament of Queensland
20th-century Australian politicians